This is a survey of the postage stamps and postal history of Réunion.

It is an overseas department of France and an integral part of the French Republic.

First stamps
The first stamps of Reunion were issued on 1 January 1852. From 1885 French colonies stamps were overprinted for use in Reunion.

Later issues
The first set of definitives was issued in 1892. Reunion used stamps of France surcharged in CFA franc from 1949 to 1974. Since 1975 stamps of France have been used without surcharge.

See also 
Postage stamps of the French Colonies

References

Further reading 
"Isle Bourbon and Isle de France" by Robson Lowe in The Philatelist, September 1974.

External links
http://www.stampdomain.com/country/reunion/display.htm
The Indian Ocean Study Circle
The France & Colonies Philatelic Society of Great Britain

Réunion
Reunion